Bilby is a hamlet in Nottinghamshire, England. It is part of the civil parish of Barnby Moor. It is located 5 miles west of Retford, close to the A1 road. Bilby was recorded in the Domesday Book as Billebi.

References

Hamlets in Nottinghamshire
Barnby Moor